Sava Tekelija (1761–1842) was the first Serbian doctor of law, the founder of the Tekelijanum, president of the Matica srpska, philanthropist, noble, and merchant.

Life 

Born in Arad in the Habsburg monarchy (today in Romania) Tekelija studied at a Serb elementary school, went to a Buda Gymnasium, and studied law in Pest. He finished his studies in 1785, and became the first Serb doctor of law (doctor juris) a year later.

See also 
 Serbs of Romania
 Serbs of Budapest
 Serbs of Hungary
 Sava Vukovic (merchant)

References 

1761 births
1842 deaths
People from Arad, Romania
Serbs of Romania
Members of the Serbian Academy of Sciences and Arts
Serbian philanthropists
Matica srpska
18th-century Serbian lawyers
19th-century Serbian lawyers
Serbian merchants
Serbian educators